Chubutherium is an extinct genus of ground sloth from the Late Oligocene and Early Miocene of Chubut Province, Argentina.

Description 
This species of ground sloth was assigned to the family Scelidotheriidae, which was subsequently demoted to subfamily Scelidotheriinae within Mylodontidae, then elevated back to full family status. It is related to the Pleistocene genus, Scelidotherium. It possessed but a few molars, like many other sloths. Only a few specimens have been found in Patagonia. Little material is found of the genus and the taxonomic position is still debated.

References

Bibliography

Further reading 
  (1962) Un nuevo (Xenarthra) del Terciario de Patagonia, Chubutherium ferelloii  gen. et sp. nov. (Megalonychoidea, Mylodontidae).  Revista del Museum Argentinoa Ciencias Nacional "Bernardino Rivadavia" Zoologia, 8(11): 123–133.

Prehistoric sloths
Prehistoric placental genera
Oligocene xenarthrans
Miocene xenarthrans
Oligocene genus first appearances
Miocene genus extinctions
Oligocene mammals of South America
Miocene mammals of South America
Colhuehuapian
Deseadan
Paleogene Argentina
Neogene Argentina
Fossils of Argentina
Fossil taxa described in 1962